Rubus vulgaris  is a European species of flowering plant in the rose family.

Rubus vulgaris is a prickly shrub with tapering prickles curved downwards towards the base of the stem. Leaves are palmately compound with 5 leaflets. Flowers are pale lavender. Fruits are black. The species is sometimes considered to be a synonym of R. commutatus''

References

External links
photo of herbarium specimen at Missouri Botanical Garden

vulgaris
Plants described in 1824
Flora of Europe